Peter Hegemann (born 11 December 1954) is a Hertie Senior Research Chair for Neurosciences and a Professor of Experimental Biophysics at the Department of Biology, Faculty of Life Sciences, Humboldt University of Berlin, Germany. He is known for his discovery of channelrhodopsin, a type of ion channels regulated by light, thereby serving as a light sensor. This created the field of optogenetics, a technique that controls the activities of specific neurons by applying light. He has received numerous accolades, including the Rumford Prize, the Shaw Prize in Life Science and Medicine, and the Albert Lasker Award for Basic Medical Research.

Early life and education 
Hegemann was born in Münster in 1954, but grew up in Aachen. Many in his immediate and extended family are doctors, including his parents, brother, and both grandfathers. He was educated in a humanities-oriented gymnasium (humanistisches Gymnasium) for secondary school, which he disliked for his lack of interest in classical studies. He liked science subjects and was at first interested in discovery of new territories and then in the outer space. Eventually, he went to the University of Münster in 1975 to study chemistry, transferring to the Ludwig Maximilian University of Munich two years later to switch to biochemistry.

After graduating in 1980, Hegemann pursued his PhD at the Max Planck Institute of Biochemistry in the research group of Dieter Oesterhelt, who has just become the Director of the institute. He completed it in 1984.

Career 
Having won a fellowship for his PhD thesis, Hegemann went to Syracuse University in 1985 as a postdoctoral fellow in Kenneth W. Foster's lab for a year. After returning to Germany, he was offered a five-year position as a principal investigator at the Max Planck Institute of Biochemistry.

In 1993, Hegemann joined the Department of Biochemistry of the University of Regensburg as a professor. He moved to the Humboldt University of Berlin in 2004 and became a Professor of Experimental Biophysics. In 2015, he was endowed with a Hertie Senior Research Chair for Neurosciences.

Research 
Hegemann's research into light-gated ion transport began in his PhD years, when he investigated the structure and function of halorhodopsin, a active ion transporter found in a type of archaea called haloarchaea that uses light energy to move chloride ions against the gradient. As part of his PhD project, he characterized this protein in Halobacterium salinarum, discovering that yellow light activates halorhodopsin. When halorhodopsin is expressed in neurons and activated by light, the influx of chloride ions shifts the neuron to more negative electric potential, stopping the action potential and inactivating the neurons.

A 1984 article by Kenneth W. Foster of Syracuse University suggested that rhodopsins would also serve as light detector in the green alga Chlamydomonas reinhardtii. This also prompted Hegemann to spend a year with Foster as a postdoctoral fellow. Hegemann continued characteizing this rhodopsin after returning to Germany. Working on another green alga, he found that it had a fast electrical response (by ion movement through ion channel) to light stimulation, and proposed that the ion channel and the light-detecting rhodopsin were one single protein complex.

In 2002, collaborating with Georg Nagel and Ernst Bamberg, Hegemann made the landmark identification of the gene for this rhodopsin and named it Channelrhodopsin-1. The team identified the second channelrhodopsin gene, Channelrhodopsin-2, the next year. In both studies, they cloned the genes from Chlamydomonas reinhardtii and expressed them in the oocytes of African clawed frog. Upon blue light stimulation, electrical currents was detected in the oocytes. When channelrhodopsins are expressed in neurons and stimulated, the ion channel opens so positively charged calcium and sodium ions can enter the neurons, creating a more positive electric potential inside the neurons and activating them. This is the opposite of halorhodopsin.

The field of optogenetics took off from these discoveries. In 2005, Hegemann reported expressing channelrhodopsin in chicken embryos, their movement can be controlled with light stimulation. This came in the same year as another study by a collaboration between Karl Deisseroth, Edward Boyden, Feng Zhang, Georg Nagel and Ernst Bamberg, which found light could lead to action potential in cultured neurons expressing channelrhodopsin. Teaming up with Deisseroth, Hegemann continued advancing optogenetics by developing rhodopsin variants that could react faster and more accurately, and detect different wavelengths of light.

Using optogenetic techniques, Hegemann and collaborators have confirmed that the unbalanced activity of excitatory and inhibitory neurons causes behavioural deficits of mental disorders.

Honours and awards

References

External links 
 

1954 births
Living people
German biophysicists
Syracuse University faculty
Academic staff of the Humboldt University of Berlin
Academic staff of the University of Regensburg
Members of the German Academy of Sciences Leopoldina
Members of the European Molecular Biology Organization
Members of the United States National Academy of Sciences
Fellows of the American Academy of Arts and Sciences
Gottfried Wilhelm Leibniz Prize winners
Harvey Prize winners
Massry Prize recipients
Recipients of the Albert Lasker Award for Basic Medical Research
European Research Council grantees